= Kathleen Wheatley =

American management scholar

Kathleen K. Wheatley is an American management scholar.

Wheatley earned a Bachelor of Science in bioengineering, followed by a Master's of Science in engineering management and a PhD in strategic management at Syracuse University. She is the UC Foundation and George M. Clark Professor of Management Policy at the University of Tennessee at Chattanooga.
